David John Pattison Martin (born 5 February 1945) is a British Conservative politician.

Early life
Martin is a farmer, barrister and former employee of the family caravans and motorhomes sales business "Martins Caravans Company Ltd." founded by his father, the late  John Besley Martin, CBE. He was educated at Kelly College, Tavistock and Fitzwilliam College, Cambridge where he also was part of the Hawks' Club and later a member of Inner Temple.

Parliamentary career
Martin served as a Teignbridge District councillor from 1979 to 1983. He stood for Yeovil at the 1983 general election but was defeated.

He served as the Conservative Member of Parliament for Portsmouth South from 1987 until 1997 general election, when he was unseated by the Liberal Democrat candidate Mike Hancock. He stood again at the 2001 general election in the seat of Rugby and Kenilworth and at the 2005 general election in the seat of Bristol West but was unsuccessful on both occasions.

Family
According to a source he is married to Basia Dowmunt and has one son and three daughters, including the fiction novel author Cesca Major (née Martin). He is also paternal uncle of Coldplay's lead vocalist, Chris Martin.

References

External links 
 

1945 births
Alumni of Fitzwilliam College, Cambridge
Living people
Conservative Party (UK) MPs for English constituencies
UK MPs 1987–1992
UK MPs 1992–1997
Conservative Party (UK) councillors
Councillors in Devon
People educated at Kelly College